Varvara Alekseyevna Baranova (born 13 February 1996) is a Russian canoeist. She competed in the women's K-2 500 metres event at the 2020 Summer Olympics.

References
https://www.canoeicf.com/athlete/varvara-baranova

External links
 

1996 births
Living people
Sportspeople from Ulyanovsk
Russian female canoeists
Canoeists at the 2020 Summer Olympics
Olympic canoeists of Russia